Cinerama Holiday is a 1955 film shot in Cinerama. Structured as a criss-cross travel documentary, it shows an American couple traveling in Europe and a European couple traveling in the United States.  Like all of the original Cinerama productions, the emphasis is on spectacle and scenery. The European sequences include a point-of-view bobsled ride, while the U.S. sequences include a point-of-view landing on an aircraft carrier.

Plot

Reception
The film earned $10 million in domestic rentals and became the highest grossing film of 1955 in the United States, surpassing other motion pictures such as Mister Roberts, Battle Cry and Oklahoma!.

Largely unseen for decades, the film was released on Blu-ray in 2013, restored and remastered from the original camera negatives.

References

Further reading

External links

Cinerama Holiday at TCMDB

1955 films
1955 documentary films
Cinerama
Films set in Paris
Films set in Switzerland
Films set in the Alps
Films set in the United States
Films set in the Las Vegas Valley
Films set in New Orleans
Films set in New York City
Films set in San Francisco
Films set in Washington, D.C.
1950s English-language films
American documentary films